Gonu (고누) or Kono is a group of Korean traditional boardgames. 

When playing Konou, a person who has a lower number start like Janggi. The usual way of playing is to surround and detach the opponent's pieces. It is mainly used for children's educational purposes.

Examples 
 Five Field Kono (오밭고누)
 Umul Gonu (우물고누)

Reference 

Abstract strategy games
Asian games
Korean games
Traditional board games
Korean inventions
Games played on Go boards